West Bengal Electronics Industry Development Corporation Limited (WEBEL) is the government agency responsible for technology development in West Bengal, India. It was incorporated in 1974 with the objective of developing the electronics industry in West Bengal.

Business activities
Through its  subsidiary companies, WEBEL engages in the manufacture of electronic components and equipments. It also engages in infrastructure development activities for the electronics industry, including the development of the Taratala Industrial Estate and the Salt Lake Electronics Complex took shape.

It has executed  turnkey projects, such as the Automatic Message Switching System at the Tribhuvan International Airport in Nepal, and the Toll Collection System at Vidyasagar Setu, Kolkata. It  has also implemented e-governance projects including a private optical fiber network, and the West Bengal State Wide Area Network (WBSWAN). WBSWAN forms the basic backbone of the Indian government's e-governance programme.

The organisation also has brought internet bandwidth to make rural India the back office of urban India for tele-education, telemedicine, e-governance, entertainment, and has followed up with projects in  health care, law and order, and commercial tax applications.

The organisation has implemented an application, the first of its kind in the country, networking all 411 police stations of West Benga, with applications such as criminal tracking system, an application which permits messaging and access to data at grass-root levels to track crime.

WEBEL has developed a computerised Braille transcription system [BTS] in twelve Indian languages comprising Braille-to-text software, an electronic tactile reader, automatic braille embosser, and audio-supported Braille keybo  The system covers transcription in languages such as Bangla, Hindi, Assamese, Oriya, Marathi, Gujarati, Punjabi, Tamil, Telugu, Kannada, Malayalam, Nepali and English.

Subsidiaries 
Its subsidiary Webel Mediatronics Limited engages in the development, manufacturing, and turnkey project execution in the areas of studio and broadcasting systems, industrial electronics, information technology applications, and systems for the disabled. It has in the last 10 years developed and commercialized a host of systems for visually impaired, cerebral palsy-affected, hearing handicapped, and autistic persons. It has a close working relationship with Prasar Bharati, the Indian Ministry of Information and Broadcasting, the Indian Ministry of Communication and Information Technology, and research institutes and universities in the country.

Its subsidiary Webel Informatics Limited has a mission is to upgrade the level of computer literacy in West Bengal, and produces around 6,000 professionals every year. With more than 140 franchise locations all over the state, including Bhairab Ganguly College, the company also conducts corporate training in 100 government-aided schools. In association with the Indian government and IBM, the organisation has launched an IT literacy programme in secondary and higher secondary schools.  WEBEL has set up Toonz Webel Academy, an international animation academy that produces industry-ready animators. Webel Informatic's Information Technology Education and Training divisions conduct diploma and certificate courses in software, hardware with networking and multimedia, and a host of information technology courses for beginners, with special emphasis on training college students to help make them industry-ready professionals after  graduation. It is the regional Cisco Network Academy for Eastern India and awards Cisco Certified Network Associate. It is also the authorized training partner of Red Hat, conducting Red Hat Certified System Administrator and Red Hat Certified Engineer for individuals and corporate clients.

Manufacturing activities

Quartz crystals
Electrolytic capacitors
 Black-and white picture tubes
 Electronically driven tools
Thyristor-controlled AC Drives
Studio and broadcasting equipment
 Television sets
Transreceivers
Electronic telephone exchanges
EPBTs

References
 West Bengal Electronics Industry Development Corporation Limited – official website
 BTS by Webel Mediatronics Limited – electronic Braille repository

State agencies of West Bengal
State industrial development corporations of India
Companies based in Kolkata
1974 establishments in West Bengal
Government agencies established in 1974